Mukhtiar Singh Malik (1913- 2008)  was a member of Lok sabha and Rajya Sabha from Haryana He was a leader of Bharatiya Janata Party. He had also been a member of Haryana Legislative Assembly .

References

2008 deaths
1913 births
Lok Sabha members from Haryana
Rajya Sabha members from Haryana
Bharatiya Jana Sangh politicians
India MPs 1971–1977
India MPs 1977–1979
Haryana MLAs 1966–1967
Haryana MLAs 1968–1972
Bharatiya Janata Party politicians from Haryana